"The Unveiling" is the seventh episode of the third season of the post-apocalyptic horror television series Fear the Walking Dead, which aired on AMC on July 9, 2017 along with the mid-season finale "Children of Wrath".

This episode features the return of Mercedes Mason as Ofelia Salazar who had been absent since the season 2 penultimate episode "Wrath".

Plot 
Jake and Alicia arrive at Black Hat, where Alicia discovers Ofelia to be alive and allied with Walker's tribe. Jake and Walker agree to a parley with an exchange of hostages to guarantee the truce; Alicia remains at Black Hat while Jake returns to Broke Jaw with Ofelia. While at Black Hat, Alicia learns that Walker's people have a water shortage and a prophecy of the apocalypse, seeing it as a sign to reclaim their former lands. Madison blackmails Troy to lead a team to rescue Alicia from Black Hat, breaking the truce and killing several of Walker's men. Jake attempts to mend ways by delivering Ofelia and a truckload of water, but he is beaten and nearly scalped. Later, Ofelia arrives at Broke Jaw, seemingly cast out. A crippling illness suddenly strikes the community and many of the militia die and reanimate as walkers, massacring the residents; Nick sees Ofelia running and realizes she was responsible before he also falls sick.

Reception 
"The Unveiling", along with the mid-season finale "Children of Wrath", received positive reviews from critics. On Rotten Tomatoes, "The Unveiling" garnered a 75% rating, with an average score of 7.52/10 based on 8 reviews.

In a joint review along with the mid-season finale "Children of Wrath", Matt Fowler of IGN gave "The Unveiling" an 8.6/10.0 rating, stating; "Fear the Walking Dead took us out of this half season with a tense and suspenseful one-two punch that brought back Ofelia while also resolving the calamitous conflict over the ranch in a meaningful manner."

Ratings
"The Unveiling" was seen by 2.62 million viewers in the United States on its original air date, above the previous episodes rating of 2.19 million.

References

2017 American television episodes
Fear the Walking Dead (season 3) episodes